Robert M. Bowman Jr. (born 1957) is an American Evangelical Christian theologian specializing in the study of apologetics.

Biography

Bowman received the M.A. in Biblical Studies and Theology from Fuller Theological Seminary in 1981, did doctoral studies in Christian Apologetics at Westminster Theological Seminary, and earned his Ph.D. in Biblical Studies at the South African Theological Seminary.  From 2006 to 2008 he was the manager of Apologetics and Interfaith Evangelism for the North American Mission Board (based in Alpharetta, Georgia), an agency of the Southern Baptist Convention. From 2008 to 2018 he served as the executive director of the Institute for Religious Research, an independent, evangelical nonprofit organization (formerly located in Grand Rapids, now based in Cedar Springs, Michigan). He is married to wife Cathy with four children.

Writings
Bowman is the author of nearly sixty articles and of a dozen books. Five of those books he co-authored with Kenneth D. Boa, an Oxford-trained scholar; two of these books (An Unchanging Faith in a Changing World and Faith Has Its Reasons) won the Gold Medallion Book Award. Four of his earliest books were theological critiques of the teachings of Jehovah’s Witnesses.

Putting Jesus in His Place: The Case for the Deity of Christ (2007, with J. Ed Komoszewski)
Sense and Nonsense about Heaven and Hell (2007, with Kenneth D. Boa)
Sense and Nonsense about Angels and Demons (2007, with Kenneth D. Boa)
Faith Has Its Reasons: Integrative Approaches to Defending Christian Faith (2001, 2006, with Kenneth D. Boa)
20 Compelling Evidences That God Exists (2002, with Kenneth D. Boa)
The Word-Faith Controversy: Understanding the Health and Wealth Gospel (2000)
An Unchanging Faith in a Changing World (1998, with Kenneth D. Boa)
Jehovah’s Witnesses (1995)
Orthodoxy and Heresy: A Biblical Guide to Doctrinal Discernment (1992)
Understanding Jehovah’s Witnesses: Why They Read the Bible the Way They Do (1991)
Why You Should Believe in the Trinity: An Answer to Jehovah’s Witnesses (1989)
Jehovah’s Witnesses, Jesus Christ, and the Gospel of John (1989)

References

External links 
 Website of Robert M. Bowman, Jr.
 Institute for Religious Research

American Christian theologians
1957 births
Converts to evangelical Christianity from Roman Catholicism
Living people
Westminster Theological Seminary alumni
Evangelical Ministries to New Religions